Senator Knowlton may refer to:

Hosea M. Knowlton (1847–1902), Massachusetts State Senate
John S.C. Knowlton (1798–1871), Massachusetts State Senate